Giuliano Ferrara (born 7 January 1952) is an Italian politician, journalist, and TV presenter. He is the founding editor of Il Foglio.

Early life and career 
Ferrara came from a family of communists; his father Maurizio was a senator for the Italian Communist Party (PCI), and the two would remain close, even though his father did not share his rightward shift in the 1980s and 1990s. Ferrara was active in the PCI during his twenties. In 1982, he broke with the party and became vocal as an ex-Communist within the Italian Socialist Party. As a member of the PSI, he endorsed Franco Carraro as mayor of Rome.

Influenced by the political philosopher Leo Strauss, Ferrara initially gravitated toward socialism but later moved toward social conservatism. As a member of Forza Italia, he was in the Berlusconi I Cabinet and founded the newspaper Il Foglio in 1996.

Political positions

Abortion 
In 1989, Ferrara used the pages of Corriere della Sera to criticize what he perceived as a decline in male responsibility following the introduction of the first abortion pills. He ran in the 2008 Italian general election on a platform favouring a moratorium on abortion, as part of a theoconservative Italian political current of which he is one of the most prominent leaders. In his early 20s, he acknowledged that three of his partners had abortions.

Europe's Christian roots 
Ferrara agrees with the Catholic Church regarding the defence of the Judeo-Christian roots of Europe.

Personal life 
Ferarra is married to writer Anselma Dell'Olio, who fought for women's rights in the feminist movements during the 1960s and 1970s. He has been one of the strongest supporters of Pope Benedict XVI. Although considered by his opponents an atheist, he considers himself a theist.

Legal problems 
In 2003, Antonio Tabucchi wrote an article about bad facts about Ferrara for the French newspaper Le Monde; the article was never published because Ferrara interfered with them publishing it on its own newspaper Il Foglio. He then said that he was happy to have reached the goal to get that article before Le Monde newspaper. He was condemned for unauthorized publishing and for copyright infringement.

References

External links 
 Articles written on Panorama 

1952 births
Former Marxists
Government ministers of Italy
Italian anti-abortion activists
Italian male journalists
Italian newspaper editors
Italian newspaper founders
Italian television personalities
Living people
Writers from Rome